Time of the Wolf is a 2002 drama film directed by Rod Pridy and starring Burt Reynolds, Marthe Keller and Devin Douglas Drewitz. The plot concerns an orphan boy who goes to live with his only surviving relatives. It was filmed in Point Pelee National Park and Toronto, Ontario, Canada.

Plot
When Aaron loses his parents, the only family he has left are his estranged aunt and uncle (Burt Reynolds), who are reluctant to take the young boy in. But with no other options, Aaron moves into their farm house, nestled in the sprawling wilderness, and begins a new life. Aaron finds much comfort in exploring the nature around him and becomes even more intrigued when he spots a white wolf patrolling the nearby bridge. When he witnesses a hunter wound on the majestic animal, Aaron reaches out to the wolf and creates a bond that will become very important to protecting both of their lives.

Cast
Burt Reynolds as Archie McGregor
Marthe Keller as Rebecca McGregor
Devin Douglas Drewitz as Aaron
Jason Priestley as Mr. Nelson
John Neville as Preacher
Jamie Kerr as Josh Grossler
Steven Taylor as Freddy McGuire
Charlotte Arnold as Paige McGuire
Anthony Lemke as Alex McKenzie

Note
The film is unrelated to the French suspense drama La Temps du Loup starring Isabelle Huppert and released in America as Time of the Wolf the following year.

External links
 
 
 

2002 films
2002 drama films
Films about orphans
Films scored by John Scott (composer)
2000s English-language films